Shogun Films (formerly GoodKnight Films) is an Indian film production company, which produces mainly Malayalam films. It is owned by R. Mohan (also known as GoodKnight Mohan). It has also produced Hindi films such as Gardish and Kabhi Na Kabhi, which established popular director Priyadarshan in Bollywood.

Selected filmography
Isabella
Chakkikotha Chankaran
Iyer the Great
Njan Gandharvan
Nayam Vyakthamakkunnu
Kilukkam
Maya Mayooram
Gardish (Hindi)
Sukham Sukhakaram
Minnaram
Spadikam
Kaalapani
Asuravamsam
Kabhi Na Kabhi (Hindi)
Krishnagudiyil Oru Pranayakalathu
Aahaa..! (Tamil)
Raja Ko Rani Se Pyar Ho Gaya (Hindi)
Chandni Bar (Hindi)
Vellithira
Kochi Rajavu
Gauri: The Unborn (Hindi)
Ettum Gusthiyum
Seedan (Tamil)

References

External links
 Shogun Films at Box Office India
 Shogun Films at Msidb

Film production companies of Kerala
Year of establishment missing